Selgjärv is a lake of Estonia.

It is located in Kastre Parish, Tartu County.

See also
List of lakes of Estonia

Lakes of Estonia